Cecil John Shuttleworth (March 24, 1892 – May 23, 1963) was an American prison administrator. He was the first Associate Warden of Alcatraz Federal Penitentiary under James A. Johnston from 1934. Both men were known for their strict discipline and known as "iron men".

A few years later he became associate warden of Leavenworth in Kansas. On January 1, 1942, he was promoted to warden of the Prison Camps/Federal Correctional Institution, Milan in Michigan.

References

1892 births
1963 deaths
American prison wardens
Wardens of Alcatraz Federal Penitentiary
American prison officials
Canadian emigrants to the United States
People from Bruce County